Josh Kaifa (born 21 July 1992) is a New Zealand rugby union player, who currently plays as a loose forward for  in New Zealand's domestic National Provincial Championship competition.

Early career

Kaifa hails from Auckland, where he attended Onehunga High School. He played for the school's 1st XV team alongside future  and  teammate Stacey Ili.

After leaving school, he moved to Australia where he played for Melbourne club Footscray in the Dewar Shield competition. During that time, in 2012, he played for – and captained – the Victoria Under 20 team in an interstate tournament, including a 42–5 win over Queensland Country in the final.

The following year, he moved to Sydney where he played two seasons for the Parramatta Two Blues in the Shute Shield competition. He made his debut for Parramatta on 6 April 2013 against Sydney University and played a total of 36 games for the club.

He returned to New Zealand in 2015, where he played for – and captained – Manukau Rovers in the Auckland club rugby competition. On 27 July 2015, Kaifa was named in the Auckland B squad. At the end of the season, he was named the Auckland B player of the year. A year later, he was named the Auckland Club player of the year.

Kaifa is the cousin of former Australia hooker Tatafu Polota-Nau.

Senior career

Kaifa was named in the  squad for the 2016 Mitre 10 Cup season. He made his debut for the province, via the bench, against  on 26 August 2016. He earned his first start for Auckland against  on 25 September, that year.

In 2017, Kaifa missed out on a spot in the Auckland's Mitre 10 Cup squad, but still made two appearances for the province as an injury replacement.

In 2018, he moved to Hawke's Bay, where he played for Clive Rugby & Sports Club in the province's club rugby competition. On 8 August 2018, he was named in the  squad for the 2018 Mitre 10 Cup season. He made his first appearance and start for the province on 19 August 2018 against  and scored a try on debut. Since that game, he's been a regular in the Hawke's Bay match day 23.

Since his arrival in Hawke's Bay, Kaifa played several games for the  Development team, but wasn't offered a Super Rugby contract.

References

1992 births
Living people
People educated at Onehunga High School
New Zealand rugby union players
Rugby union players from Auckland
Rugby union flankers
Rugby union number eights
Auckland rugby union players
Hawke's Bay rugby union players
Moana Pasifika players